Theatre Gargantua is a Toronto-based theatre company founded by Artistic Director Jacquie P.A. Thomas in 1992. The company emphasizes artist collaboration, both within Canada and globally, combining a range of artistic disciplines to create new work. The defining experimental style of Theatre Gargantua's productions are a hybrid of Thomas' studies in Europe, which include creation as an artistic collective, an extended development phase, imagistic production elements, original composition often performed live and choreographed physicality of performers. The topics of exploration in Gargantua's past shows have been grounded in social issues, creating compelling work that is presented through highly physical performances.

The Company 
The company consists of a permanent Artistic and Associate Artistic Director along with core members and associate artists who work regularly with the company on a project basis. Production staff are hired on a project-by-project basis or as needed.

The company works as a collective to generate each project through exploration and discovery of social issues relevant to our society. Starting with an idea or social issue, artists are asked to research or create work using the idea as inspiration. From there, the idea begins to seed and grow into characters and plot. Production elements are designed to invoke metaphoric meaning and experiment with various visual and physical components.

Core Artistic Members 
 Jacquie Thomas - Founder and Artistic Director
 Michael Spence - Associate Artistic Director
 Joel Benson - Core performance member
 Diane Niec - Core performance member

Technique and Style 
The Theatre Gargantua style of performance is as much physical as textual, with productions being built by the company from the ground up over a period of years. The technique is quite different than presenting a traditional script. Theatre Gargantua's productions blend live music, acrobatics and imagery. Their performance style has been compared to Montreal's avant-garde. The company's theatre works are diverse in terms of subject, writing and performance styles, but are connected in how each work melds daring physicality with striking designs, underpinned by original live music and the innovative use of technology. The company's production of e-DENTITY, could be categorized as a form of mediatized theatre, and was described as "a world where live and mediatized bodies perform together."

Mainstage Cycle 
Theatre Gargantua’s productions are developed over a two-year cycle consisting of the creation, development and performance of work. New projects are developed over the annual spring and summer season of first year, with fully produced public performances of the work in development in the fall. In the second year of a cycle, the work is re-examined and explored throughout the spring and summer seasons sometimes resulting in a radically different production, which receives its premiere in the fall of the second year. The remounting of shows from completed cycles may occur for tours or festivals.

SideStream 
Theatre Gargantua’s SideStream project is developed by core and associate artists, designed with touring in mind. The first SideStream Cycle, Shrapnel, was created by core member Joel Benson in 2013.

Current Season

Reflector 
Still in development, Reflector had its first year production in November 2016, and its premiere in November 2017 at Theatre Passe Muraille.

Past Productions

Mainstage Productions 

Avaricious (2014-2015)
 Written by Michael Spence and the ensemble (contributions by Kat Sandler), directed by Jacquie P.A. Thomas

The Sacrifice Zone (2012-2013)
 Written by Suzie Miller, directed by Jacquie P.A. Thomas
 Winner of 2014 Dora Mavor Moore Award in Outstanding Sound Design/Composition

Imprints (2010-2011)
 Written by Michael Spence, directed by Jaquie P.A. Thomas
 Premiered at the Factory Theatre in Toronto

fIBBER (2007-2008)
 Written by Michael Spence, directed by Jacquie P.A. Thomas
 Premiered at The Theatre Centre in Toronto

e-DENTITY (2005-2006)
 Written by Michael Spence, directed by Jacquie P.A. Thomas
 Remounted as part of Mirvish Productions 2007 season

(nod) (2003-2004)
 Written by Rick Roberts, directed by Jacquie P.A. Thomas
 Premiered at Factory Theatre in 2003

Phantom Limb (2001-2002)
 Co-production with Welsh company 20:21 Performance
 Written by Spencer Hazel with text from Jane Siberry & Michael Timmins, directed by Jacquie P.A. Thomas
 Premiered at the Royal Exchange Theatre in Manchester, England
 Made its Canadian debut in spring 2002

The Exit Room (1999-2000)
 Written by Michael Spence, directed by Jacquie P.A. Thomas

Love not Love (1997-1998)
 Written by Michael Spence, conceived and directed by Jacquie P.A. Thomas
 Toured to Montreal in December 1998

Raging Dreams - Into the Visceral (1995-1996)
 Written by Meryn Cadell and Jacquie P.A. Thomas, conceived and directed by Jacquie P.A. Thomas
 Premiered as part of Theatre Passe Muraille season in 1996
 Performed at the Theatre la Chapelle in Montreal in 1998
 Headlined the Portland Oregon Performing Arts Festival in 2000
 Remounted in winter 2008
 Remounted in spring 2017 at the Harbourfront Centre

The Trials: Fortune’s Desire (1992-1994)
 Directed by Jacquie P.A. Thomas
 Performed in historic St. Stephens in the Fields Church, Toronto

SideStream Productions 
Leaving Still (2016)
 Conceived and performed by Michelle Polok as part of 401 Richmond's Built For Art: A Secret Garden series for Nuite Blanche 2016.
 Co-produced with The Sephine Collective.

The Hum (2015)
 Created by Jenny Aplin, Julia Aplin, John Gzpwski, Michael Spence, and Jacquie P.A. Thomas
 Co-produced with the GZAP Collective

Trace (2014)
 Conceived and directed by Bruce Barton with Vertical City Performance
 Presented by the 2014 SummerWorks Performance Festival in Toronto

Shrapnel (2013)
 Written by Joel Benson, directed by Michael Spence

Theatre Gargantua and Education 
Theatre Gargantua is committed to fostering a deep engagement in the arts. The company is highly respected among university and high school educator, offering student matinees at discounted rates, as well as some of the most specialized and enriching workshops in physical theatre and the integration of arts and technology available.

The company offers an annual Master Class in Dynamic Creation for professional artists, and artistic and management internships for emerging artists.

Student programs include physical theatre workshops which allow students to learn alongside company members resulting in the performance of physical theatre integrated with technology.

References

External links 
 Theatre Gargantua

Theatre companies in Toronto